Jari Nikkilä is a Finnish professional footballer who currently plays for the Ykkönen side Tampereen Palloveikot in Finland.

See also
Football in Finland
List of football clubs in Finland

References

Guardian Football

1989 births
Living people
Finnish footballers
Veikkausliiga players
Kakkonen players
Ykkönen players
FC Haka players
Tampere United players
Tampereen Pallo-Veikot players
FC Ilves players
Association football defenders